Salinillas de Bureba is a municipality and town located in the province of Burgos, Castile and León, Spain. According to the 2014 census (INE), the municipality has a population of 51 inhabitants.

Main sights
Santa Casilda sanctuary (16th century)

References

Municipalities in the Province of Burgos